BlowOut is a 2003 run and gun video game developed by Terminal Reality and published by Majesco Entertainment, released for the Microsoft Windows, PlayStation 2, Xbox, and GameCube.

Gameplay
The game plays as a 2.5D side-scrolling run and gun shoot 'em up with elements of a platformer. It follows the tradition of games such as Contra and Metal Slug, with a power-up-based non-linear exploration structure akin to Metroid. The player takes the role of TransFed Marshall John "Dutch" Cane, a space marine sent to check up on researchers on the space platform named Honour Guard, only to discover that they have been mutilated by aliens. On the way through each level, the player can blast through walls, floors or ceilings to reveal secret areas, and shoot in full 360-degree range. There are 10 levels in total.

Reception

The game received "mixed or average reviews" on all platforms according to the review aggregation website Metacritic.

Publication history
On January 26, 2009, the game was released on the Xbox Live Marketplace as part of the Xbox Originals program.

References

External links
Official site

2003 video games
GameCube games
Majesco Entertainment games
Metroidvania games
Military science fiction video games
PlayStation 2 games
PlayStation Network games
Run and gun games
Side-scrolling platform games
Single-player video games
Video games about extraterrestrial life
Video games developed in the United States
Video games set in outer space
Video games set in the future
Video games with 2.5D graphics
Windows games
Xbox games
Xbox Originals games
Terminal Reality games